Bitlia is a village (selo) in Sambir Raion, Lviv Oblast, in southwest Ukraine. It belongs to Borynia settlement hromada, one of the hromadas of Ukraine. Its population is 1,101. Local government — Bitlianska village council.

The village Bitlia is located in the Ukrainian Carpathians within the limits of the Eastern Beskids in southwestern Lviv Oblast in Turka Raion.

The first written mention of the settlement dates back to 1512.

Until 18 July 2020, Bitlia belonged to Turka Raion. The raion was abolished in July 2020 as part of the administrative reform of Ukraine, which reduced the number of raions of Lviv Oblast to seven. The area of Turka Raion was merged into Sambir Raion.

Notes

References 
 weather.in.ua

Literature 
  Page 877.

Villages in Sambir Raion